Skeneoides is a genus of sea snails, marine gastropod mollusks in the family Skeneidae.

Species
Species within the genus Skeneoides include:
 † Skeneoides crassistriata Lozouet, 1999 
 Skeneoides exilissima (Philippi, 1844)
 Skeneoides formosissima (Brugnone, 1873)
 † Skeneoides tenuistriata Lozouet, 1999 
Species brought into synonymy
 Skeneoides digeronimoi (La Perna, 1998): synonym of Dasyskenea digeronimoi (La Perna, 1998) (original combination)
 Skeneoides jeffreysii (Monterosato, 1872): synonym of Skeneoides formosissima (Brugnone, 1873)

References

 Gofas, S.; Le Renard, J.; Bouchet, P. (2001). Mollusca, in: Costello, M.J. et al. (Ed.) (2001). European register of marine species: a check-list of the marine species in Europe and a bibliography of guides to their identification. Collection Patrimoines Naturels, 50: pp. 180–213
 Spencer, H.; Marshall. B. (2009). All Mollusca except Opisthobranchia. In: Gordon, D. (Ed.) (2009). New Zealand Inventory of Biodiversity. Volume One: Kingdom Animalia. 584 pp

External links
 Warén A. (1992). New and little known "Skeneimorph" gastropods from the Mediterranean Sea and the adjacent Atlantic Ocean. Bollettino Malacologico 27(10-12): 149-248

 
Skeneidae
Gastropod genera